The Sergeant First Class John H. Newnam Armory, also known as the Chestertown Armory, is a historic National Guard armory built in 1931 and located in Chestertown, Kent County, Maryland, United States. From 1933 until 2005 it housed various formations from the Maryland Army National Guard. It also was the home of sporting and community events during this time. After the 115th Infantry Regiment was merged into the 175th Infantry Regiment in 2005, the armory was declared to be surplus by the state of Maryland. The Chestertown Armory was transferred to Washington College in 2013. Since then, it has stood vacant. The college is investigating the possibility of turning it into a bed and breakfast.

Architecture
It is a two-story brick structure with a full basement that emulates a medieval fortification. The front facade features an entryway flanked by simple two-story towers, which are topped by small square stone panels.

History

Planning and construction
In 1930, the Maryland Military Department purchased a  lot along the Chester River to build a new armory. To fund the construction, the Maryland General Assembly appropriated $50,000 of bond money. After a year, due to trouble securing plans, Maryland awarded contract to erect the building Carl Schmidt for $47,000.

National Guard use
From 1932 until 2005, The Chestertown Armory was home to various formations from the Maryland Army National Guard. In addition to its military uses, the armory became a hub for Chestertown and Washington College. From 1934 until the 1950s, the Washington College Men's Basketball team played their home games there. It also hosted concerts and community events.

The armory was accepted in February 1932, and it became the home of the Chestertown Medical Detachment of the First Maryland Infantry Regiment. They remained stationed at the armory until 1941 when the First Maryland Infantry Regiment and Fifth Maryland Infantry Regiment were merged to create the 115th Infantry Regiment. In 1947, Company G of the 115th Infantry Regiment was raised at armory. It would remain the unit stationed at the armory until 1968 when the 29th Infantry Division was deactivated and the armory was transferred to the 175th Infantry Regiment.

When the 29th Infantry Division was resurrected in 1984, the armory received a $500,000 renovation to become the headquarters of the 2nd Battalion of the 115th Infantry Regiment. The next year, The Chestertown Armory was listed on the National Register of Historic Places On 11 August 1999, the building was renamed in honor of John H. Newnam, a Chestertown resident who landed on Omaha Beach on D-Day. Due to consolidation, the armory was closed and declared surplus in 2005 when the 115th Infantry Regiment was merged into the 175th Infantry Regiment.

Washington College ownership
After the departure of the Maryland National Guard from the armory, there was much discussion over what should be done with the building. In 2007, two proposals emerged: one by Washington College and the other by the local homeless shelter. By the end of the year, a consortium of local businesses and the college put forth a proposal to pay the costs of Kent County buying the site. In 2013, the Chestertown Armory was transferred to Washington College. The structure continues to sit vacant. In 2019, What's Up? Magazine reported that the college was investigating the possibility of turning it into a bed and breakfast.

Units
1932-1941: Chestertown Medical Detachment, First Maryland Infantry Regiment, Maryland Army National Guard
1941-1947: Company E, Medical Detachment, 115th Infantry Regiment, 29th Infantry Division
1947-1968: Company G, 115th Infantry Regiment, 29th Infantry Division
1968-1984: 2nd Battalion, 175th Infantry Regiment, 28th Infantry Division
1984-2005: 2nd Battalion, 115th Infantry Regiment, 29th Infantry Division

References

External links

, including photo from 1980, at Maryland Historical Trust

Buildings and structures in Kent County, Maryland
Armories on the National Register of Historic Places in Maryland
Infrastructure completed in 1931
National Register of Historic Places in Kent County, Maryland